Paul Nielsen (born 30 August 1947) is a Canadian luger. He competed in the men's singles event at the 1972 Winter Olympics.

References

1947 births
Living people
Canadian male lugers
Olympic lugers of Canada
Lugers at the 1972 Winter Olympics
Sportspeople from Alberta